Leucoma lechrisemata is a moth of the family Erebidae. It is found in north-western Madagascar.

The forewings of this species are white with an iridescent surface, the underside, hindwings and fringes are white with a dull surface.
Head and body are white, the pulpus is orange.

Wingspan: male: 38 mm - female: 40–45 mm.
This species has been found in altitudes between 120 and 1040 m.

References

Lymantriinae
Moths described in 1959
Moths of Madagascar
Moths of Africa